Vandiperiyar, is a spice village in Idukki district, Kerala, India. It is known for tourism, tea and coffee plantations, black pepper and other spice products. A number of tea factories are situated in the town. The Periyar River flows through the city.

Geography

It is located at an altitude of 836 m above MSL.

The Periyar River flows through Vandiperiyar.

Demographics
As of 2011 Census, Periyar village had a population of 22,978 which constitutes 11,397 males and 11,581 females. In Periyar, 9.38% of the population was under 6 years of age. Periyar had an average literacy of 86.38% higher than the national average of 74% and lower than state average of 94%.

Location
Vandiperiyar is on National Highway 183, directly connected with  Kottayam. Thekkady is 18 km away.

Economy

Tea, coffee and pepper plantations are abundant. They are the main source of income for many people.

References

External links

 About Vandiperiyar

Cities and towns in Idukki district